Nhyiaeso is suburb of Kumasi. Kumasi is the regional capital of the Ashanti Region of Ghana.  It is a residential area in the Kumasi Metropolitan Assembly. It is about 2 kilometre northwards from centre of the regional capital. The town in the Nhyiaeso Constituency. The town is both a residential and business area.

Adjoining towns
The town is bordered on the north by Santasi, on the south and east by Kejetia - Adum and on the west by Danyame.

Notable place
Nhyiaeso is known for its string of hotels and guest houses. Among them are the Royal Lamerta Hotel, Yegoala Hotel. There are several banks in the town namely: CAL Bank, Barclays bank, Standard Chartered bank etc. The French government also has a French teaching centre - the Alliance Francais teaching centre.  Tigo one of Ghana's telecommunication companies has its regional office in the town.

See also
Nhyiaeso Constituency

References

Populated places in Kumasi Metropolitan Assembly